Nadhim Shaker Salim (18 December 1958 – 11 September 2020) was an Iraqi football player and coach of the Iraq national team.

Playing career
Nadhim Shaker was one of the most talented defenders in Iraqi football history. He began his playing career at Al-Amal in 1976 before moving to (Al-Quwa Al-Jawiya) the following year and played for the club until 1988, after which he became a player-manager for the Al-Salam club.

He played for the Iraq national team from 1978 till 1986. The defender represented Iraq at the 1979 World Military Championship and at the 1986 FIFA World Cup finals in Mexico playing against Paraguay, Belgium and the hosts, Mexico.

Managerial career
On 8 December 2018, Shaker became the new coach for Erbil. He led the team in 17 games, winning five. He ended up leaving the team on 27 April 2019.

Death
Shaker died on 11 September 2020, at a hospital in Erbil from COVID-19 during the COVID-19 pandemic in Iraq.

Career statistics
Scores and results list Iraq's goal tally first, score column indicates score after each Shaker goal.

Managerial statistics

References

External links
 Nadhim Shaker profile on goalzz.com

 

1958 births
2020 deaths
Sportspeople from Baghdad
Iraqi footballers
Association football defenders
Iraq international footballers
1986 FIFA World Cup players
Al-Quwa Al-Jawiya players
Iraqi football managers
Iraqi expatriate football managers
Al-Shorta SC managers
Al-Mina'a SC managers
Al-Quwa Al-Jawiya managers
Iraq national football team managers
Iraqi expatriate sportspeople in Iran
Expatriate football managers in Iran
Deaths from the COVID-19 pandemic in Iraq